Paradox Development Studio (PDS) is a Swedish video game developer founded in 1995. It is closely associated with its parent company and video game publisher, Paradox Interactive. It is best known for its grand strategy wargame series Europa Universalis, Hearts of Iron, Victoria, Crusader Kings, Stellaris, and Imperator.

History
PDS is based on the heritage of the Swedish board game company Target Games, and has been a game developer of PC-focused grand strategy games since 1995, including the Europa Universalis, Hearts of Iron, Victoria, Crusader Kings, Stellaris, and Imperator series. The company continued to create PC games and in 1999, the company was divided into two separate entities: Paradox Interactive, which focused on creating grand strategy games for PC, and Paradox Entertainment, which focused on creating board and role-playing games.

In January 2012, the company divided yet again into two studios, becoming Paradox Interactive and Paradox Development Studio. Paradox Interactive became the game publisher focused on PC games of various genres and Paradox Development Studio became the game development studio focused on grand strategy games.

The game development studio was one of the first video game developers to create games in the grand strategy genre, and most of the games the studio has developed fall into that category. Grand strategy games are strategy games that usually cover the entire world map and include elements such as economy, diplomacy and warfare.

Studios
In 2021, Paradox Development Studio has reorganized and split into five internal development teams, with each one handling one of the Paradox's own IPs.

While this left Imperator: Rome without a dedicated development team, PDS leads stated that they are figuring out how they will return to the series in time.

Game engines 
To date, Paradox have engineered two main proprietary game engines for their titles, Europa and Clausewitz. Both were also designed to be open to anyone who wishes to modify the original game files to create mods. As a result, games can be modded with as little as a text editor, which has led to the development of strong modding communities for each of Paradox's games.

Paradox developed its debut game Europa Universalis in 2000, and used large chunks of its code for its next games. Although this code overlap was subsequently referred to as the Europa Engine, studio manager Johan Andersson clarified that the 'engine' had not been part of the initial designs of each of the company's first six games, and that it just resulted from copy-pasting large parts of code from one game to the next. In April 2008, Paradox allowed certain indie game developers to freely use the (by then) superseded engine as part of their Europa Engine Licensing Program. The move led to the development of games such as For the Glory, Arsenal of Democracy, Darkest Hour, and Iron Cross.

In 2007, the studio debuted a new game engine, called Clausewitz Engine in Europa Universalis III. Named after the Prussian general Carl von Clausewitz, the new engine provides a 3D view of part or the totality of the world map, depending on the played game. Sengoku (released 2011) was the first game utilizing the Clausewitz 2 engine. The studio's 17th game, Imperator: Rome (released 2019), was also built using Clausewitz, but with the addition of new 64-bit software known as "Jomini" (named after 19th century Swiss general Antoine-Henri Jomini) that allows for better 3D rendering and easier creation of mods. The newly improved engine now also features support for DirectX 11.

List of games developed 
List of games developed by Paradox Development Studios. Note that in addition to this list there are two other games developed in the early 2000s when the studio was part of Paradox Entertainment, Crown of the North and Two Thrones, both part of the Svea Rike series.

Europa Engine

Clausewitz Engine

References

External links
Official website

Video game companies of Sweden
Video game development companies
Video game companies established in 1995
Companies based in Stockholm
Swedish companies established in 1995
Paradox Interactive